Andheri ([ən̪d̪ʱeɾiː]) is a suburb in the western part of the city of Mumbai in India. Udayanagari, the name of a hill near the Mahakali caves, inspired the name Andheri. On the former islet of Versova, also known as Vasave, there was another cluster of native East Indians. Andheri east and west are key areas in Mumbai, with several film studios and TV news channels. MIDC, Andheri has a jewelry production unit (east).

Government 
For administrative purposes, the area is separated into Andheri West and Andheri East. Andheri West comes under K/W ward of the Brihanmumbai Municipal Corporation while Andheri East comes under the K/E ward of the same.

Transportation
The Andheri railway station is among the busiest railway stations in the city The expansion of the Mumbai Metro in the Versova-Andheri-Ghatkopar corridor is a part of the government's master transportation plan.

Mumbai Metro
It is fully elevated, and consists of 12 stations. 9 out of the 12 stations are in Andheri. Work on the corridor began on 8 February 2008. A cable stay bridge over Western Express Highway & a Steel Bridge spanning the Western railway line, on the project was completed at the end of 2012. The line opened for service on 8 June 2014. Latest statistics reveal that approximately 85 million passengers have used the metro line in the first 11 months since its launch.

Yellow Line 2 will intersect with Blue Line 1 at DN Nagar Metro and Red line 7 at WEH Metro station respectively in Andheri once it open in 2022.

Pink Line 6 will function from Lokhandwala to Kanjurmarg via Jogeshwari of 14.5 km long, expected to open from 2024.

See also
 Mira Road
 List of schools and colleges in Andheri

References

Notes
Shrivastava, Prabhat, and S. L. Dhingra. "Operational Integration Of Suburban Railway And Public Buses—Case Study Of Mumbai." Journal of Transportation Engineering 132.6 (2006): 518–522. Academic Search Premier. Web. 29 May 2012.

Suburbs of Mumbai
Talukas in Maharashtra
Mumbai Suburban district
Andheri